The Latin Grammy Award for Best Merengue/Bachata Album is awarded for "vocal or instrumental Merengue and/or Bachata albums containing at least 51% playing time of newly recorded material". The award was originally  as Best Merengue Album and established in 2000 before it was discontinued in 2007. The award was brought back with its current name in 2019.

Years reflect the year in which the Latin Grammy Awards were presented, for works released within the eligibility period.

Winners and nominees

2000s

2010s

See also
Grammy Award for Best Merengue Album

References

External links
Official site of the Latin Grammy Awards

 
Awards established in 2000
Merengue Album